Vee F. Browne (born 1956 in Ganado, Arizona) is an American writer of children's literature, and journalist. She is from Cottonwood and Tselani Arizona, and a member of the Navajo Nation, belonging to the Bitter Water and Water Flows Together clans.

Browne studied journalism at the New Mexico State University. She obtained her M.A. from Western New Mexico University in 1990. She has worked as a journalist in Navajo Hopi Observer. She is also an Arizona Interscholastic Athletic Association volleyball and basketball referee.

Works
 Monster Slayer: A Navajo Folktale, Northland Publishing, 1991
 Monster Birds, Northland Publishing, 1993
 Maria Tallchief: prima ballerina, Modern Curriculum Press, 1995
 Owl: American Indian legends, Scholastic Inc., 1995
 Council of the rsinmakers address book, Northland Publishing, 1995
 Ravens dancing, 1st Books Library, 2001
 Birds and eggs, By Dixie Anderson, Molly Bang, Vee Browne, etal.,(publisher unknown), 2001
 The stone cutter & the Navajo maiden, Salina Bookshelf, 2008

Awards and recognition
 1992  Western Heritage – Cowboy Hall of Fame Award, for her 1991 book, Monster Slayer
 
 Buddy Bo Jack Nationwide Award for Humanitaianis for Children's Books
 1994 Western Books Award of Merit, Rounce & Coffin Club, Los Angeles, for Monster Birds

References

1956 births
Living people
20th-century American journalists
20th-century American writers
21st-century American writers
20th-century American women writers
21st-century American women writers
20th-century Native Americans
21st-century Native Americans
American children's writers
American women children's writers
American women journalists
Native American journalists
Navajo writers
People from Ganado, Arizona
Writers from Arizona
20th-century Native American women
21st-century Native American women